The 2020 Prosperita Open was a professional tennis tournament played on clay courts. It was the 17th edition of the tournament which was part of the 2020 ATP Challenger Tour. It took place in Ostrava, Czech Republic between 31 August and 6 September.

Singles main-draw entrants

Seeds

 1 Rankings are as of 24 August 2020.

Other entrants
The following players received wildcards into the singles main draw:
  Tomáš Macháč
  Dalibor Svrčina
  Otto Virtanen

The following players received entry into the singles main draw as special exempts:
  Tallon Griekspoor
  Aslan Karatsev

The following players received entry from the qualifying draw:
  Marc-Andrea Hüsler
  Zdeněk Kolář
  Vít Kopřiva
  Mats Moraing

The following player received entry as a lucky loser:
  Malek Jaziri

Champions

Singles
 
 Aslan Karatsev def.  Oscar Otte 6–4, 6–2.

Doubles

 Artem Sitak /  Igor Zelenay def.  Karol Drzewiecki /  Szymon Walków 7–5, 6–4.

References

External links
Official Website

2020 ATP Challenger Tour
2020
2020 in Czech tennis
August 2020 sports events in the Czech Republic
September 2020 sports events in the Czech Republic